Trinidad is a city in Henderson County, Texas, United States, near the Trinity River from which the town's name was derived. The population was 860 at the 2020 census, down from 886 at the 2010 census.

During the Spanish Texas period, the town was known as Santísima Trinidad de Salcedo. (See Gutiérrez–Magee Expedition.)

Geography

Trinidad is located along the western edge of Henderson County at  (32.147365, –96.090791). The western border of the city follows the Trinity River, which forms the Navarro County line. The eastern border of the city follows Cedar Creek, a tributary of the Trinity, and the northern boundary of the city in part follows the dam at the south end of Cedar Creek Reservoir.

Texas State Highway 31 passes through Trinidad, leading east  to Athens, the Henderson county seat, and west  to Corsicana, the Navarro county seat.Texas State Highway 274 leads north from Trinidad up the west side of Cedar Creek Reservoir  to Kemp.

Climate

The climate in this area is characterized by hot, humid summers and generally mild to cool winters.  According to the Köppen climate classification, Trinidad has a humid subtropical climate, Cfa on climate maps.

Demographics

As of the 2020 United States census, 860 people, 356 households, and 212 families resided in the city.

As of the census of 2000, 1,091 people, 430 households, and 297 families were residing in the city. The population density was 73.4 people per square mile (28.3/km2). The 474 housing units had an average density of 31.9 per square mile (12.3/km2). The racial makeup of the city was 83.13% White, 13.02% African American, 0.55% Native American, 2.47% from other races, and 0.82% from two or more races. Hispanics or Latinos of any race were 6.60% of the population.

Of the 430 households, 34.2% had children under 18 living with them, 47.2% were married couples living together, 17.9% had a female householder with no husband present, and 30.7% were not families. About 28.6% of all households were made up of individuals, and 14.4% had someone living alone who was 65 or older. The average household size was 2.54, and the average family size was 3.14.

In the city, the age distribution was 29.5% under 18, 9.3% from 18 to 24, 25.5% from 25 to 44, 20.6% from 45 to 64, and 15.1% who were 65 or older. The median age was 34 years. For every 100 females, there were 89.7 males. For every 100 females 18 and over, there were 81.8 males.

The median income for a household in the city was $46,379, and for a family was $65,568. Males had a median income of $28,438 versus $18,958 for females. The per capita income for the city was $114,270. About 15.5% of families and 1.0% of the population were below the poverty line, including 20.2% of those under 18 and 20.4% of those 65 or over.

Education
The city is served by the Trinidad Independent School District.

References

External links
 City of Trinidad official website
 

Cities in Henderson County, Texas
Cities in Texas